Ed Donatell (born February 4, 1957) is an American football coach who last served as the defensive coordinator for the Minnesota Vikings of the National Football League (NFL). Donatell has 42 years of coaching experience, including 31 seasons in the NFL. In addition to coaching defensive backs for Broncos Head Coach Vic Fangio for eight years with the Denver Broncos (2019–21), Chicago Bears (2015–18) and San Francisco 49ers (2011–14), he has been a defensive coordinator for eight seasons with Green Bay Packers (2000–03), Atlanta Falcons (2004–06), University of Washington (2008) and the Denver Broncos (2019–21).

Career
Donatell served as the defensive coordinator for the University of Washington Huskies football team from January to December 2008 under Tyrone Willingham. He and the entire staff were let go after the winless 2008 season.  Previously he served as a special assistant to the New York Jets. Donatell served as the defensive coordinator for the Atlanta Falcons of the National Football League under head coach Jim Mora for three seasons, prior to which he occupied this position for the Green Bay Packers.

He eventually started working as the San Francisco 49ers defensive backs coach under defensive coordinator Vic Fangio. When Fangio joined the Chicago Bears in 2015, Donatell followed.

On January 15, 2019, the Denver Broncos hired Donatell as their defensive coordinator. He tested positive for COVID-19 on November 1, 2020, and missed six games before returning in Week 14.

On February 4, 2022, it was announced that the Seattle Seahawks had hired Donatell in a senior defensive role. However, on February 10, it was announced that Donatell would not be joining the Seahawks and would instead join the Minnesota Vikings as their defensive coordinator for the 2022 season.

On January 19, 2023, Vikings head coach Kevin O'Connell announced Donatell had been fired.

Personal life
He graduated from Stow High School in Stow, Ohio, and later earned a master's degree in administration from Kent State University.  He is married and has three children.  His son Tom is defensive quality control coach for the Seattle Seahawks.

References

1957 births
Living people
Atlanta Falcons coaches
Denver Broncos coaches
Green Bay Packers coaches
New York Jets coaches
San Francisco 49ers coaches
Chicago Bears coaches
Washington Huskies football coaches
National Football League defensive coordinators
Kent State University alumni
Sportspeople from Akron, Ohio
Minnesota Vikings coaches